The Swagman is a supervillain in comic books published by DC Comics. He is primarily an enemy of Batman and the Dark Ranger.

Publication history

Fictional character biography
Swagman began his career as a criminal in Australia, often coming into the conflict with the Dark Ranger.

Sometime before the Batman R.I.P. storyline, Swagman was recruited by the Black Glove and became a member of the Club of Villains, under the leadership of Doctor Simon Hurt. During the storyline, Swagman took part in Doctor Hurt's plan to drive Batman over the edge of his sanity. As part of the elaborate scheme, Doctor Hurt, who is well aware that Batman is Bruce Wayne, sends a wealthy criminal named Jezebel Jet to pose as a love interest for Bruce Wayne to weaken his mental state. The plan ultimately works and the Black Glove discovers the location of the Batcave. The Batcave is compromised by members of the Club of Villains and Bruce Wayne has a mental breakdown, but Wayne was not unprepared. Bruce Wayne had created a back-up personality which he buried in the back of his mind just in case a situation like this ever occurred. His back-up personality kicks in and Bruce Wayne becomes the Batman of Zur-En-Arrh.

Unaware that Batman is no longer incapacitated, the Club of Villains begin targeting the other members of the Batman Family. Swagman is tasked with taking down Robin but is unable to do so. The Batman of Zur-En-Arrh and members of the Batman Family and the Club of Heroes track down the Club of Villains to their base. After a drawn out conflict, the Club of Villains are defeated and Batman returns to his former personality. During the conflict, Swagman is rendered unconscious by the Dark Ranger.

Powers and abilities
Taking inspiration from famed Australian bushranger Ned Kelly, Swagman protects himself by wearing heavy amounts of crude body armor and carrying various weaponry, such as grenade launchers and swords.

In other media

Swagman makes a cameo in the Batman: The Brave and the Bold episode "The Knights of Tomorrow!", as part of a montage showcasing villains who were defeated by the future Batman and Robin. It turned out that the events of the episode were all part of a book that Alfred Pennyworth was writing.

See also

 Batmen of All Nations
 List of Batman family adversaries
 Batman R.I.P.
 Batman Incorporated

References

External links
 Swagman (New Earth) at DC Wiki
 Swagman (The Brave and the Bold) at DC Wiki
 Swagman at Comic Vine

Fictional Australian people
Fictional bounty hunters
DC Comics male supervillains
DC Comics supervillains
Batman characters
Comics characters introduced in 2008
Characters created by Grant Morrison
Characters created by Tony S. Daniel